Bezlyudovka is a rural locality (a selo) in Shebekinsky District, Belgorod Oblast, Russia. The population was 824 as of 2010. There are 20 streets.

Geography 
Bezlyudovka is located 15 km west of Shebekino (the district's administrative centre) by road. Grafovka is the nearest rural locality.

References 

Rural localities in Shebekinsky District